The 2010 Liège–Bastogne–Liège monument classic cycling race took place on April 25, 2010. This race was won by Alexander Vinokourov after slipping into a breakaway with Alexandr Kolobnev. Vinokourov attacked on the last hill with under 500m to go to take the victory. Alejandro Valverde, the winner in 2006 and 2008, finished third in the race, but was stripped of the result as a result of a doping suspension applied on May 31, 2010.

Results
All riders from third place onwards promoted by one place following the retroactive suspension of Alejandro Valverde

{| class="wikitable"
|-
!
!Cyclist
!Team
!Time
|-
| 1
| | | align="right"| 6h 37' 48"'|-
| 2
| 
| 
| align="right"| + 6"
|-
| 3
| 
| 
| align="right"| + 1' 04"
|-
| 4
| 
| 
| align="right"| + 1' 04"
|-
| 5
| 
| 
| align="right"| + 1' 07"
|-
| 6
| 
| 
| align="right"| + 1' 07"
|-
| 7
| 
| 
| align="right"| + 1' 07"
|-
| 8
| 
| 
| align="right"| + 1' 07"
|-
| 9
| 
| 
| align="right"| + 1' 07"
|-
| 10
| 
| 
| align="right"| + 1' 18"
|}

Controversy
On December 6, 2011, Swiss magazine l'Illustre published an email correspondence between the winner and runner-up that suggests Vinokourov paid Kolobnev €100,000 not to contest the final sprint. While Kolobnev has not commented on the allegations, Vinokourov has denied them, claiming that the payment was part of his "private life", and that he "makes payments left and right" but "never offered to buy the win from Kolobnev". On December 7, Vinokourov announced legal action against l'Illustre'' for an "invasion of privacy", and threatened further litigation against "anyone who infringes on [his] integrity".

On December 8, the UCI, whose rules specifically ban "collusion or behavior likely to falsify or go against the interests of the competition", announced it would investigate the incident.

Both riders were later charged with bribery by Belgian authorities.

References

External links

Liège–Bastogne–Liège
Liege-bastogne-liege, 2010
Liege